Taeniophyllum muelleri, commonly known as the chain ribbonroot, is a species of leafless epiphytic or lithophytic orchid that usually forms tangled colonies. It has short stems and cylindrical green roots pressed against the substrate on which it is growing. Between five and twelve yellowish green, tube-shaped flowers open one at a time. This orchid occurs in eastern Australia and New Caledonia.

Description
Taeniophyllum muelleri is a leafless, epiphytic or lithophytic herb that forms tangled colonies. Flowering occurs from August to September.

Taxonomy and naming
Taeniophyllum muelleri was first formally described in 1873 by George Bentham after an unpublished description by John Lindley and the description was published in Flora Australiensis. The type specimen was collected "on trees near Brisbane" by Walter Hill. The specific epithet (muelleri) honours Ferdinand von Mueller.

Distribution and habitat
The chain ribbonroot usually grows on the smallest branches of rainforest trees sometimes on rocks, on coast and nearby ranges of Queensland, New South Wales north from the Bellinger River and New Caledonia.

References

Muelleri
Endemic orchids of Australia
Orchids of New South Wales
Orchids of Queensland
Orchids of New Caledonia
Plants described in 1873